Registe, also known as Women Directors, is a 2014 Italian independent film written and directed by Diana Dell'Erba.

Plot
Registe, talking on a blade is an Italian documentary about the Italian Cinema signed by women and about the pioneer of the Silent Cinema Elvira Notari (1875-1946) plays by Maria De Medeiros. The directors interviewed are the most important Italian women directors: Lina Wertmüller, Cecilia Mangini, Francesca Archibugi, Francesca Comencini, Wilma Labate, Cinzia Th Torrini, Roberta Torre, Antonietta De Lillo, Giada Colagrande, Donatella Maiorca, Ilaria Borrelli and other.

Cast

 Maria De Medeiros: Elvira Notari
 Lina Wertmüller: herself
 Cecilia Mangini: herself
 Francesca Archibugi: herself
 Francesca Comencini: herself
 Cinzia Th Torrini: herself
 Roberta Torre: herself
 Giada Colagrande: herself
 Donatella Maiorca: herself
 Gian Luigi Rondi: himself
 Anselma Dell'Olio: herself
 Silvana Silvestri: herself
 Eliana Lo Castro Napoli: herself
 Eugenio Allegri: Vincenzo Caccavone
 Gian Maria Villani: Gennariello
 Marco Sabatino: Nicola Notari
 Rebecca Volpe: Goddess Lilith
 Ilaria Borrelli: herself
 Maria Sole Tognazzi: herself
 Antonietta De Lillo: herself
 Anne Riitta Ciccone: herself
 Alina Marazzi: herself
 Donatella Baglivo: herself
 Elisa Mereghetti: herself
 Anna Negri: herself
 Nina Di Majo: herself
 Paola Randi: herself
 Susanna Nicchiarelli: herself
 Stefania Bonatelli: herself

References

External links
 
 

Italian documentary films
2014 documentary films
Documentary films about feminism
2010s Italian films